Lorenzi is a surname. Notable people with the surname include:

Battista di Domenico Lorenzi (1527–1594), Italian sculptor of Alpheus and Althusa
Stoldo Lorenzi (1534 – after 1583), Italian Mannerist sculptor
Giovanni Battista Lorenzi (1721–1807), Italian librettist
Milton Lorenzi Haney (1825–1922), regimental chaplain in the United States Army 
Harri Lorenzi (born 1949), Brazilian agronomic engineer 
Benito Lorenzi (1925–2007), Italian football player
Marie-Laure de Lorenzi (born 1961), French professional golfer
Christian Lorenzi (born 1968), French professor and researcher in psychoacoustics
Gianluca de Lorenzi (born 1972), Italian auto racing driver
Stefano Lorenzi (born 1977), Italian professional football player 
Paolo Lorenzi (born 1981), Italian professional tennis player
Grégory Lorenzi (born 1983), French football player

See also
Lorenzo (disambiguation)
Laurentius, a given name and surname

Italian-language surnames
Latin-language surnames
Patronymic surnames
Surnames from given names
Surnames of South Tyrolean origin